Gaurishankar is currently referred to as Ward No. 9 under Gaurishankar Rural Municipality in Bagmati Province, Dolakha District  of Nepal. At the time of the 1991 Nepal census it had a population of 1,392 people living in 291 individual households. There are divided to 3 villages which are Tasi Nam, Simi Gau and Beding.

References

External links
UN map of the municipalities of Dolakha District

Populated places in Dolakha District